Jacques Cavallier-Belletrud (born 24 January 1962) is a French perfumer formerly with the Swiss fragrance and flavor company Firmenich, who currently works for Louis Vuitton of the LVMH Luxury Group.

He has created or collaborated in the creation of over 80 fragrances and perfumes for fashion house brands such as Parfums Christian Dior, Parfums Givenchy, Issey Miyake, Yves Saint Laurent, Fenty Beauty and Lancôme.

Biography
Cavallier was born in Grasse, "the capital of perfume", a town known for centuries for its manufacture of perfumes, to a family that lived in the town since the 15th century. His father and grandfather were also perfumers, and he credits as having been his greatest influences. As a child, his father trained him in the fragrances of natural raw components, and he has stated that the ingredients he considers most essential for perfumers to use include rose, agar wood, jasmine and orange flower. He began working in perfume factories in Grasse during the summers beginning at the age of 10. He studied English and Spanish at the University of Nice.

Career
He first joined the perfumery company Charabot, and after 3 years went to the fine fragrance lab at Quest International in Naarden, Netherlands. In 1988, he joined the firm of PFW Aroma Chemicals B.V. and then moved to the fragrance and flavor conglomerate Firmenich in 1990. At Firmenich, he collaborated with Alberto Morillas to create Calvin Klein Truth, Carolina Herrera Chic, Ermenegildo Zegna Essenza di Zegna, Givenchy Hot Couture, Oscar de la Renta Intrusion, Van Cleef & Arpels Murmure, Van Cleef & Arpels Zanzibar for Men, and Yves Saint Laurent M7; he collaborated with Olivier Cresp to create Cacharel Amor Pour Homme Tentation, Christian Dior Midnight Poison, Diesel Fuel for Life Unlimited, Lancôme Magnifique, Nina Ricci Nina, Paco Rabanne Pour Elle and Yves Rocher So Elixir and YSL Elle. He also collaborated with Chantal Roos to create the iconic Issey Miyake L'Eau d'Issey in 1991, Jean Paul Gaultier Women in 1993, Issey Miyake L'Eau d'Issey for Men, Issey Miyake Le Feu and Yves Saint Laurent Nu. While Tom Ford was Creative Director at YSL, he created for him Cinema, M7, Nu and Rive Gauche Pour Homme and under Tom Ford's own label, Tuscan Leather and Noir de Noir, both with the collaboration of Harry Fremont, who was also worked with Cavallier on Calvin Klein Man.

Despite Cavallier’s extensive knowledge of natural components of fragrances, his biggest successes have come from the inclusion in several of his most successful perfumes of a synthetic molecule, methylbenzodioxepinone (8-methyl-1,5-benzodioxepin-3-one), known in the industry as Calone 1951, and colloquially as "watermelon ketone". Calone imparts a light, airy, sea-breeze scent with an aqueous watermelon/melon feel that was used by Cavallier in Aqua di Gio and L'Eau d'Issey in the 1990s  and Bulgari Aqva Pour Homme Marine in 2008. Calone 1951 provides the main "marine" scent in perfumes, and Cavallier was among the first perfumers to incorporate this scent into the “water” or “marine” category of fragrances.

He considers his most successful perfumes to be Giorgio Armani Acqua di Gio (for men) and Issey Miyake L’Eau d’Issey (for women). He has said that his favorite fragrances created by someone other than himself are Eau Sauvage by Christian Dior, created in 1966 by Edmond Roudnitska
 and Opium by Yves Saint Laurent, created in 1977 by perfumers Jean-Louis Sieuzac, Jean Amic and Raymond Chaillan. Cavallier credits the synthetic jasmine-like molecule hedione (Methyl dihydrojasmonate) for contributing to the long lasting freshness characteristic of Eau Savage, and has said that Opium reminds him of the great advances in perfumery that occurred in the late 1970s.

Cavallier has been described as combining artistry and technical expertise, with a “mastery of several olfactory archetypes …  has a huge aesthetic range”, according to the New York Times perfume critic Chandler Burr.

In 2012, Cavallier left Firmenich to join the LVMH Luxury Group (Louis Vuitton Moët Hennessy SE) to formulate the first fragrance for Louis Vuitton, which is expected to be released in 2016. The LVMH Group owns several fragrance brands including Parfums Christian Dior, Guerlain, Parfums Givenchy, Kenzo Parfums and Fendi Perfumes. Jacques Cavallier will collaborate with veteran perfumer François Demachy who is already at LVMH, but Demarchy will be more involved with technical and creative direction, rather than as an in-house perfumer. LVMH has committed to building a new fragrance laboratory in Grasse, a reconstructed building on the site of a 17th-century bourgeoisie house, initially to be used for development of the Louis Vuitton and Parfums Christian Dior brands.

With Cavallier joining Louis Vuitton as its Master in-house perfumer, LVMH is following a trend to having dedicated in-house perfumers working at luxury fragrance brands, including Jacques Polges at Chanel, Jean-Claude Ellena at Hermès, Mathilde Laurent at Cartier, Thomas Fontaine at Jean Patou and Thierry Wasser at Guerlain.

Award(s)
In 2004, Jacques Cavallier was awarded the Prix François Coty, now known as the Prix International du Parfum.

References

Living people
1962 births
French perfumers
People from Grasse